Lake Andes is a city in, and the county seat of, Charles Mix County, South Dakota, United States. The population was 710 at the 2020 census.

The town took its name from Lake Andes which some say derives its name from a pioneer hunter named Handy, while others believe was named after Edward Andes, a fur company official. The town and the lake are referred to as Bde Ihaƞke in Dakota language of the native Yankton Sioux Tribe.

YST Transit serves the community and connects riders to Marty, Ravinia and Wagner as well.

Geography
Lake Andes is located within Yankton Sioux Tribe's reservation, at  (43.156825, -98.538053).

Demographics

2010 census
As of the census of 2010, there were 879 people, 316 households, and 195 families residing in the city. The racial makeup of the city was 40.8% White, 0.1% African American, 52.7% Native American, 0.1% Asian, 0.1% from other races, and 6.1% from two or more races. Hispanic or Latino of any race were 2.8% of the population.

There were 316 households, of which 40.2% had children under the age of 18 living with them, 28.2% were married couples living together, 26.6% had a female householder with no husband present, 7.0% had a male householder with no wife present, and 38.3% were non-families. 34.8% of all households were made up of individuals, and 19.6% had someone living alone who was 65 years of age or older. The average household size was 2.52 and the average family size was 3.24.

The median age in the city was 33.8 years. 32.1% of residents were under the age of 18; 7.7% were between the ages of 18 and 24; 21.6% were from 25 to 44; 19.9% were from 45 to 64; and 18.7% were 65 years of age or older. The gender makeup of the city was 47.9% male and 52.1% female.

2000 census
As of the census of 2000, there were 819 people, 320 households, and 181 families residing in the city. The population density was 1,019.7 people per square mile (395.3/km2). There were 369 housing units at an average density of 459.4 per square mile (178.1/km2). The racial makeup of the city was 54.82% White, 0.37% African American, 42.61% Native American, 0.49% from other races, and 1.71% from two or more races. Hispanic or Latino of any race were 2.20% of the population.

There were 320 households, out of which 31.3% had children under the age of 18 living with them, 36.9% were married couples living together, 15.0% had a female householder with no husband present, and 43.4% were non-families. 40.0% of all households were made up of individuals, and 20.6% had someone living alone who was 65 years of age or older. The average household size was 2.42 and the average family size was 3.33.

In the city, the population was spread out, with 30.2% under the age of 18, 7.8% from 18 to 24, 22.0% from 25 to 44, 20.0% from 45 to 64, and 20.0% who were 65 years of age or older. The median age was 37 years. For every 100 females, there were 87.8 males. For every 100 females age 18 and over, there were 86.9 males.

The median income for a household in the city was $21,000, and the median income for a family was $28,833. Males had a median income of $21,333 versus $19,097 for females. The per capita income for the city was $10,022. About 26.3% of families and 33.2% of the population were below the poverty line, including 40.7% of those under age 18 and 28.3% of those age 65 or over.

Community events
Fish Days takes place annually the first weekend in June.  The Fort Randall traditional pow wow takes place annually the first weekend in August at the pow wow grounds.

Architecture
The Charles Mix County courthouse, located in Lake Andes, is a prominent fixture in the community. Constructed in the Prairie School architectural style, it was added to the National Register of Historic Places in 1993 as a significant example of architecture and local government.

On February 21, 2012, the 1910 Engel Hotel was listed on the NRHP. It is located at 202 Main Street and was built for the railroad industry.

Gallery

Notable people
 Faith Spotted Eagle, Native American activist
 John C. Miller Jr., Brigadier general in the United States Marine Corps and veteran of World War II.

See also
 List of cities in South Dakota

References

External links

 Andes Central Schools
 Library

Cities in Charles Mix County, South Dakota
Cities in South Dakota
County seats in South Dakota